Jeff Dial (born April 4, 1976 in Los Angeles County, California) is a former State Senator in the Arizona State Legislature.

Dial was elected to the Arizona House of Representatives in 2010 and was reelected in 2012.

Dial was elected to the Arizona Senate representing the 18th district in 2014.

In 2015, the Arizona Republic reported that Dial had made an eight-year commitment to the United States Army Reserve in 1996, but Dial said he received an honorably discharge due to his weight in 2004.

In 2016, Dial's reelection was challenged by Republican candidate Frank Schmuck, police chief of Chandler, Arizona. Schmuck portrayed himself as a conservative running against a moderate. Schmuck also persistently questioned Dial's military record, asking whether Dial really earned the "Army veteran" status that Dial claimed in his campaign materials.

On August 30, 2016, Schmuck defeated Dial in the Republican primary election, receiving 53.4% of the vote.

Following the primary election, Dial endorsed Schmuck in the general election against Democratic candidate Sean Bowie and Green candidate Linda Macias, both of whom ran uncontested in their parties' primary elections.

Jeff Dial is now working as a real estate agent in the greater Phoenix-Metro area, for the Sibbach team.

References

Living people
Republican Party members of the Arizona House of Representatives
1976 births
People from Los Angeles County, California
21st-century American politicians